Bromine fluoride may refer to several compounds with the elements bromine and fluorine:

Bromine monofluoride, BrF
Bromine trifluoride, BrF3
Bromine pentafluoride, BrF5